Susanna Gross has been literary editor of The Mail on Sunday since 1999 and bridge columnist for The Spectator since 2000.

She has played bridge in many national and international competitions and represented England in home international competition for the Lady Milne Trophy. That is the annual tournament for women s, parallel in structure to the Camrose Trophy competition for open teams.

Life
Gross was born in London and educated at the University of York. She previously worked as an editor at the Daily Mail, was features editor of Harper's Bazaar, and was deputy editor of The Week.

The daughter of literary critic and writer John Gross and literary editor Miriam Gross, she is married to the novelist and critic John Preston. Her brother Tom Gross is a journalist and international affairs commentator, specialising in the Middle East.

References

External links
 
 
 WorldCat search: Gross, Susanna – dozens or hundreds of The Spectator bridge columns have been catalogued by at least one WorldCat library
 Bridge columns by Susanna Gross in The Spectator.

1960s births
Living people
Year of birth missing (living people)
British literary editors
Contract bridge writers
English contract bridge players
Bridge players from London
English women journalists
Alumni of the University of York
British women columnists
English columnists
English Jews
The Spectator people
20th-century British journalists
21st-century British journalists
20th-century English non-fiction writers
21st-century English non-fiction writers
20th-century English women writers
21st-century English women writers